In particle physics, chiral symmetry breaking is the spontaneous symmetry breaking of a chiral symmetry – usually by a gauge theory such as quantum chromodynamics, the quantum field theory of the strong interaction. Yoichiro Nambu was awarded the 2008 Nobel prize in physics for describing  this phenomenon ("for the discovery of the mechanism of spontaneous broken symmetry in subatomic physics").

Overview

Quantum chromodynamics

Experimentally, it is observed that the masses of the octet of pseudoscalar mesons (such as the pion) are much lighter than the next heavier states such as the octet of vector mesons, such as rho meson.

This is  a consequence of spontaneous symmetry breaking of chiral symmetry in a fermion sector of QCD with 3 flavors of light quarks, and  . Such a theory, for idealized massless quarks, has global  chiral flavor symmetry. Under SSB, this is spontaneously broken to the diagonal flavor SU(3) subgroup, generating eight Nambu–Goldstone bosons, which are the pseudoscalar mesons transforming as an octet representation of this flavor SU(3).

Beyond this idealization of massless quarks, the actual small quark masses also break the chiral symmetry explicitly as well (providing non-vanishing pieces to the divergence of chiral currents, commonly referred to as partially conserved axial currents [PCAC]). The masses of the pseudoscalar meson octet are specified by an expansion in the quark masses which goes by the name of chiral perturbation theory. The internal consistency of this argument is further checked by lattice QCD computations, which allow one to vary the quark mass and confirm that the variation of the pseudoscalar masses with the quark masses is as dictated by chiral perturbation theory, effectively as the square-root of the quark masses.

For the three heavy quarks: the charm quark, bottom quark, and top quark, their masses, and hence the explicit breaking these amount to, are much larger than the QCD spontaneous chiral symmetry breaking scale. Thus, they cannot be treated as a small perturbation around the explicit symmetry limit.

Mass generation
Chiral symmetry breaking is most apparent in the mass generation of nucleons from more elementary light quarks, accounting for approximately 99% of their combined mass as a baryon. It thus accounts for most of the mass of all visible matter. The source of the bulk of the proton's mass is quantum chromodynamics binding energy, which arises out of QCD chiral symmetry breaking.

Fermion condensate
The spontaneous symmetry breaking may be described in analogy to magnetization.

A vacuum condensate of bilinear expressions involving the quarks in the QCD vacuum is known as the fermion condensate.

It can be calculated as
 
formed through nonperturbative action of QCD gluons, with  This cannot be preserved under an isolated  or  rotation.

The pion decay constant,  may be viewed as a measure of the strength of the chiral symmetry breaking.

Two-quark model
For two light quarks (the up quark and the down quark) the QCD Lagrangian provides insight: The chiral symmetry  of the QCD Lagrangian describes invariance with respect to a symmetry group  This symmetry group amounts to

The quark condensate induced by non-perturbative strong interactions spontaneously breaks the  down to the diagonal vector subgroup   called isospin. The resulting effective theory of baryon bound states of QCD (which describes protons and neutrons), then, has mass terms for these, disallowed by the original linear realization of the chiral symmetry, but allowed by the spontaneously broken nonlinear realization thus achieved as a result of the strong interactions.

The Nambu–Goldstone bosons corresponding to the three broken generators are the three pions, charged and neutral. The next section outlines how a small explicit breaking in the Lagrangian gives these three pions a small mass.

Pseudo-Goldstone bosons 

Pseudo-Goldstone bosons arise in a quantum field theory with both spontaneous and explicit symmetry breaking, simultaneously. These two types of symmetry breaking typically occur separately, and at different energy scales, and are not thought to be predicated on each other.

In the absence of explicit breaking, spontaneous symmetry breaking would engender massless Nambu–Goldstone bosons for the  exact spontaneously broken chiral symmetries. The chiral symmetries discussed, however, are only approximate symmetries in nature, given their small explicit breaking.

The explicit symmetry breaking occurs at a smaller energy scale.  The properties of these pseudo-Goldstone bosons can normally be calculated using chiral perturbation theory, expanding around the exactly symmetric theory in terms of the explicit symmetry-breaking parameters. In particular, the computed mass must be small,

Three-quark model

For three light quarks, the up quark, down quark, and strange quark, the flavor-chiral symmetries extending those discussed above also decompose, to Gell-Mann's 

The chiral symmetry generators spontaneously broken comprise the coset space  This space is not a group, and consists of the eight axial generators, corresponding to the eight light pseudoscalar mesons, the nondiagonal part of 

The remaining eight unbroken vector subgroup generators constitute the manifest standard "Eightfold Way" flavor symmetries,  .

Heavy-light mesons
Mesons containing a heavy quark, such as charm (D meson) or beauty, and a light anti-quark (either up, down or strange),  can be viewed
as systems in which the light quark is "tethered" by the gluonic force  to the fixed heavy quark, like a ball tethered to a pole.  The chiral symmetry breaking then causes the s-wave ground states  (spin) to be split from  p-wave parity partner excited states  by a common "mass gap," .

In 1993 William A. Bardeen and Christopher T. Hill studied the properties of these systems implementing both the heavy quark symmetry and the
chiral symmetries of light quarks in a Nambu–Jona-Lasinio model approximation.
discussion below in the Bardeen-Hill paper) which would be zero if the chiral symmetry breaking was turned off. The excited states of non-strange, heavy-light mesons are usually short-lived resonances due to the principal strong decay mode  and are therefore hard to observe. In their paper, however, the authors remarked that though the results were approximate, the charm-strange excited mesons  could be abnormally narrow (long-lived) since the principal decay mode,  could be kinematically suppressed (or altogether blocked) owing to the  mass of the kaon. These could then be readily observed.   

Bardeen, Eichten and Hill immediately recognized that this was, indeed, the parity partner of the ground state, and predicted numerous observable decay modes, many of which have been subsequently confirmed by experiments. Similar predictions are expected in the  system (a strange and anti-beauty quark) and heavy-heavy-light baryons.

See also
 Conformal anomaly
 Little Higgs

Footnotes

References

  

 

Quantum field theory
Quantum chromodynamics
Mathematical physics
Asymmetry